"Soldier" is a song by Erykah Badu released as the second single from her fifth album, New Amerykah Part One (4th World War). The song was produced by Karriem Riggins. This was strictly a promotional single and did not have a commercial single release or music video. It prominently uses a melodic sample from the song "Theme" by Solution, a Dutch progressive rock band, along with a drum break from the song "Upon This Rock" by American saxophonist Joe Farrell.

"Soldier" was chosen in a poll after Badu asked Okayplayer users to vote on the next single to be released from New Amerykah.

Charts

References

2008 songs
Erykah Badu songs
Songs written by Erykah Badu
2008 singles
Universal Motown Records singles